Mariano Vella (15 February 1855 – 5 September 1929) was a notable New Zealand seaman, fisherman, and farmer. He was born in Macarsca, Dalmatia in 1855. After his first wife died, he returned to Dalmatia in 1894 and married Elizabetta Caterina Tarabochia, later known in New Zealand as Elizabeth. On their journey to New Zealand, they survived the sinking of the SS Wairarapa.

References

External links
 New Zealand documentary series 'Decent from disaster' made an episode about the sinking of the SS Wairarapa

1855 births
1929 deaths
New Zealand sailors
Croatian emigrants to New Zealand
New Zealand farmers
New Zealand fishers